Badges of the Danish Military are military decorations issued to soldiers who achieve a variety of qualifications and accomplishments while serving active or reserve duty in the Danish military. They are worn, on the service dress or barracks dress, either right above or on the breast pocket, depending on whether there are Danish Parachutist Brevets. There is no limit to the number worn and there is no designated order for the badges.

The badges were first created by the Danish Brigade in Exile, in order to show proficiency. It  did however not see official and wide use until the 1950s, when standardized versions were introduced.

Proficiency badges
The proficiency badges are small circular badges 25mm in diameter showing a laurel wreath and the icon in the center. They are sown onto the uniform with a small circular piece of felt backing:

Army

The army has different colors depending on the service branch:
 Infantry: Cardinal red (the two infantry regiments Royal Life Guards and Schleswig Foot Regiment)
 Jutland Dragoons: Crimson red
 Guard Hussars: White
 Artillery: Crimson red
 Engineer Regiment: Black
 Signal Regiment: Dark blue
 Train Regiment: Crimson red
 Intelligence Regiment: Grey

Navy

White

Air Force

White

Shooting badges

Skill badges

Recognition badges

Tabs
Similar in design to British and American tabs, they are worn on the right shoulder, on either service dress, barracks dress or combat uniform.

Parachute badge
The Danish parachutist badge, can only be acquired by Danish officers, high ranking NCOs and members of the Royal Danish Air Force, they are therefore relatively rare compared to other countries parachute badges. The parachutist badge is worn above the right breast pocket on the service dress or barracks dress, with the ability to wear a foreign brevet, on the pocket flap.

Auncienty

References

Bibliography

External links

Military of Denmark
Orders, decorations, and medals of Denmark
Royal Danish Army
Royal Danish Navy
Royal Danish Air Force